Sha is the Mandarin pinyin and Wade–Giles romanization of the Chinese surname written  in Chinese character. It is listed 387th in the Song dynasty classic text Hundred Family Surnames. As of 2008, it is the 216th most common surname in China, shared by 400,000 people.

Notable people
  Sha Cheng (沙澄; died 1696), Qing dynasty Minister of Rites
  Sha Liang (沙亮; died 1748), Qing dynasty general
 Sha Chunyuan (沙春元; died 1858), Qing dynasty general, killed in the Second Opium War
 Sha Yuanbing (沙元炳; 1864–1927), politician and poet
 Sha Qianli (沙千里; 1901–1982), entrepreneur, Minister of Light Industry
 Sha Menghai (1900–1992), calligrapher
 Sha Ke (沙克; 1907–1993), PLA major general
 Sha Xuejun (沙学浚; 1907–1998), Republic of China geographer
 Sha Wenhan (1908–1964), historian, Governor of Zhejiang province, brother of Sha Menghai
 Sha Fei (1912–1950), war photographer
 Sha Qi (沙耆; 1914–2005), oil painter
 Sha Gengshi (沙更世; born 1926), calligrapher and painter, son of Sha Menghai
 Sha Guohe (沙国河; born 1934), chemist, member of the Chinese Academy of Sciences
 Sha Xianming (沙显明; born 1939), PLA lieutenant general
 Sha Yexin (born 1939), playwright and political activist
 Sha Zukang (born 1947), former Under-Secretary-General of the United Nations
 Zhi Gang Sha (born 1956), self-styled spiritual healer
 Sha Hailin (沙海林; born 1957), politician and diplomat
 Sha Baoliang (沙宝亮; born 1972), singer
 Sha Yi (沙溢; born 1978), actor
 Sha Zhengwen (born 1990), member of the China women's national handball team
 Sha Yibo (born 1991), football player
 Sha Wujing, fictional character in the classic novel Journey to the West

References

Chinese-language surnames
Individual Chinese surnames